Hevn (Revenge) is a 2015 Norwegian-Canadian drama film directed by .

Cast
Siren Jørgensen - Rebekka
Frode Winther - Morten
Maria Bock - Nina
Anders Baasmo Christiansen - Bimbo
Trond Espen Seim - Ivar
Helene Bergsholm - Maya
Rakel Hamre - Emma
Kine Bortheim Jentoft - Sara

Production
The Norwegian-language movie was shot in Fjærland, Norway with post-production in Toronto. The script is based on Ingvar Ambjørnsen's novel Dukken i taket (Doll in the Ceiling) and The Doll in the Ceiling was the film's original title when it started filming in September 2014. Another working title of the film was "The Good Sister". The crew of the film is largely female. A version of the film played as a "work in progress" at the Göteborg Film Festival in January 2015.

Release
The film was released theatrically in Norway in November 2015. It was played in three festivals in 2016: in Göteborg Film Festival in February, the Beaune International Thriller Film Festival in March, and Night Visions in April.

Reception

Critical response
On review aggregator Rotten Tomatoes, the film holds an approval rating of 71%, based on 7 reviews with an average rating of 6.6/10.

Awards
At the 2016 Amanda Awards, Maria Bock was named Best Actress in a Supporting Role for Hevn.

The film received a Canadian Screen Award nomination at the 5th Canadian Screen Awards, for Michael White in the category Best Original Score.

See also
 In a Better World (Danish film with similar title)

References

External links

Norwegian Film Institute
Cineuropa

2015 films
2010s Norwegian-language films
Films shot in Norway
Films set in Norway
Norwegian films about revenge
Canadian films about revenge
Norwegian drama films
Canadian drama films
2010s Canadian films